Júnio César Arcanjo (born 11 January 1983), commonly known as Juninho, is a footballer who plays as an attacking midfielder for Anápolis. He has also played for Atlético Mineiro and, on loan, for Fluminense and Bahia.

On 25 February 2011, Juninho signed for South Korean club Daegu FC on a one-year loan. Juninho made his Daegu FC debut on 5 March  against Gwangju FC at Guus Hiddink Stadium in a 2–3 loss.

Honours
Brazil
FIFA U-20 World Cup: 2003

Fluminense
Campeonato Carioca: 2005
Taça Rio: 2005

Atlético Mineiro
Campeonato Mineiro: 2007

References

External links 
 
 
 
 placar
 CBF

1983 births
Living people
Brazilian footballers
Brazil under-20 international footballers
Clube Atlético Mineiro players
Fluminense FC players
Esporte Clube Bahia players
C.D. Nacional players
Daegu FC players
Guaratinguetá Futebol players
Primeira Liga players
K League 1 players
Brazilian expatriate footballers
Expatriate footballers in Portugal
Brazilian expatriate sportspeople in South Korea
Expatriate footballers in South Korea
Association football midfielders